Baran Duz (also Romanized as Bārān Dūz and Bārāndūz) is a village in Baranduz Rural District, in the Central District of Urmia County, West Azerbaijan Province, Iran. At the 2006 census, its population was 834, in 224 families.

Duz (also spelled Diz, Dez, or Dezh) means castle in Old Persian.

References 

Populated places in Urmia County